Thesaurica argentifera is a moth in the family Crambidae. It was described by George Hampson in 1913. It is found in Australia, where it has been recorded from Queensland.

References

Moths described in 1913
Odontiinae